Borjan Madzovski (born 8 May 1994) is a Macedonian handball player who plays for RK Pelister.

His twin brother Bojan Madzovski is also a handball player.

References
http://www.eurohandball.com/ec/cl/men/2014-15/player/542291/BorjanMadjovski 
https://web.archive.org/web/20150929062615/http://sportmedia.mk/rakomet/domashna-liga/metalurg-izgubi-ushte-eden-talent-madzhovski-prodolzhuva-vo-pelister

1994 births
Living people
Macedonian male handball players
Sportspeople from Skopje
Macedonian twins